Flavogallonic acid is a hydrolysable tannin that can be found in valonea oak (Quercus macrolepis) in chestnut wood or in Terminalia myriocarpa.

See also 
 Flavogallonic acid dilactone

References 

Hydrolysable tannins